Mohamed Aomar (born 1936) is a Moroccan alpine skier. He competed in two events at the 1968 Winter Olympics.

References

1936 births
Living people
Moroccan male alpine skiers
Olympic alpine skiers of Morocco
Alpine skiers at the 1968 Winter Olympics
20th-century Moroccan people